Class 92 may refer to:
 British Rail Class 92, a British electric locomotive
 DRG or DR Class 92 a German 0-8-0T passenger train tank locomotive with the Deutsche Reichsbahn:
 Class 92.0: Württemberg T 6
 Class 92.1: Württemberg T 4
 Class 92.2-3: Baden X b
 Class 92.4: Prussian T 13.1, Oldenburg T 13.1
 Class 92.4: BLE No. 31, LBE Nr. 123 to 129, KOE Nos. 10 and 11
 Class 92.5-11: Prussian T 13, Oldenburg T 13, PKP Class TKp1, ČSD Class 415.0
 Class 92.20: Palatine R 4/4, Bavarian R 4/4
 Class 92.21: BBÖ 578, PKP Class TKp101
 Class 92.22-23: BBÖ 178, PKP Class TKp11, ČSD Class 422.0, JDŽ 52
 Class 92.24: LAG Nr. 65 to 77 
 Class 92.25: BBÖ 478
 Class 92.26: PKP Class TKp30
 Class 92.27: PH G, PH G'
 Class 92.28: PKP Class TKp12
 Class 92.29: GörlK Nos. 181 to 183
 Class 92.33: Stettin Harbour Railway No. IX
 Class 92.61: various locomotives taken over in 1949 by the Deutsche Reichsbahn (GDR)
 Class 92.62: various locomotives taken over in 1949 by the Deutsche Reichsbahn (GDR)
 Class 92.63: various locomotives taken over in 1949 by the Deutsche Reichsbahn (GDR)
 Class 92.64: various locomotives taken over in 1949 by the Deutsche Reichsbahn (GDR)
 Class 92.65: various locomotives taken over in 1949 by the Deutsche Reichsbahn (GDR)
 Class 92.66:  locomotive taken over in 1949 by the Deutsche Reichsbahn (GDR)
 Class 92.67:  locomotive taken over in 1949 by the Deutsche Reichsbahn (GDR)  HBE Nos. 18 and 19
 Class 92.68: various locomotives taken over in 1949 by the Deutsche Reichsbahn (GDR)
 KTM Class 92
 New South Wales 92 class